Ministikwan Lake Cree Nationis a Cree First Nation in Saskatchewan, Canada. Their reserves include:

 Ministikwan 161
 Ministikwan 161A

References

First Nations in Saskatchewan